Edderkoppen (Danish and Norwegian: The Spider) may refer to:

 Edderkoppen, Danish TV series
 Edderkoppen Theatre, a theatre in Oslo